José Antonio Redolat (born 17 February 1976 in Campanar) is a Spanish runner who specializes in the 1500 metres.

Competition record

Personal bests
800 metres - 1:45.39 min (2000)
1500 metres - 3:31.21 min (2001)
One mile - 3:49.60 min (2001)
3000 metres - 7:46.0 min (2003)
5000 metres - 13:23.14 min (2008)

External links

 Personal Web

1976 births
Living people
Spanish male middle-distance runners
Athletes (track and field) at the 2000 Summer Olympics
Olympic athletes of Spain
Athletes (track and field) at the 1997 Mediterranean Games
Mediterranean Games competitors for Spain
20th-century Spanish people